Myllocerus viridanus, often known as sweet potato beetle, pod borer or ash weevil, is a species of weevil native to India and Sri Lanka.

Description
This species has a body length is about 3 to 4.5 mm. Body black, with dense uniform light green scales. Sometimes color varying to pale greenish white with chalky-white efflorescence. Head with yellow and with metallic green scales at the apex of the rostrum. Head narrowed from back to front. Eyes dorsal. Forehead with a rounded impression. Rostrum evidently longer than the head. Mandibles reddish brown. Antennae black or piceous. Prothorax subconical. Elytral striae are very narrow and covered with fine longitudinal punctures. Legs black, with green scales.

Biology
Adult weevils have been observed in numerous plants as they are known to defoliate the tender leaves and shoots extensively. Grubs feed on roots resulting in wilting of plants. Hence considered as serious polyphagous pest of economic importance.

Adults can be destroyed by using Beauveria bassiana, an entomopathogenic fungus.

Host plants

 Acacia auriculiformis
 Anacardium occidentale
 Arachis hypogaea
 Breynia retusa
 Calliandra calothyrsus
 Cassia aurantifolia
 Cassia fistula
 Citrus aurantifolia
 Citrus reticulata
 Corchorus olitorius
 Desmodium
 Erythrina stricta
 Eucalyptus robusta
 Eugenia jambolana
 Eupatorium odoratum
 Ficus exasperata
 Gliricidia sepium
 Gloriosa superba
 Helianthus annuus
 Hibiscus rosa-sinensis
 Ipomoea batatas
 Macaranga peltata
 Mallotus philippensis
 Malpighia emarginata
 Mangifera indica
 Millettia pinnata
 Moringa pterygosperma
 Morus alba
 Murraya koenigii
 Mussaenda frondosa
 Plumbago
 Populus deltoides
 Rosa × odorata
 Sapindus trifoliatus
 Senna auriculata
 Senna hirsuta
 Senna tora
 Sida acuta
 Sida rhombifolia
 Solanum melongena
 Solanum violaceum
 Sorghum bicolor
 Spinacia oleracea
 Tamarindus indica
 Tectona grandis
 Terminalia arjuna
 Terminalia tomentosa
 Theobroma cacao
 Ziziphus oenoplia

References 

Curculionidae
Insects of Sri Lanka
Beetles described in 1858